The A.N. Nesmeyanov Institute of Organoelement Compounds of Russian Academy of Sciences (INEOS RAS) was founded in 1954 by a prominent scientist, the President of the USSR Academy of Sciences, academician A. N. Nesmeyanov (1899–1980), who was a "father" of the modern chemistry of organoelement and organometallic compounds. He headed the Institute for 26 years. Major directions of research of the Institute are the following: Laboratories of Organoelement Profile, Laboratories of Polymer Profile, and Laboratories of Physical Profile.

The successors of A.N. Nesmeyanov as directors of the Institute were the Members of the Academy of Sciences of USSR and afterwards the Members of the Russian Academy of Sciences:
Academician A.V. Fokin headed INEOS RAS during a period of  1980 - 1988; 
Academician M.E. Vol’pin (1989-1996);
Academician Yu.N.Bubnov (1996-2013); 
Academician A.M. Muzafarov (2013-2018)
Corresponding Member RAS A.A. Trifonov (2018 - till present time).

At present INEOS RAS is a large research centre having ~660 employees with 564 scientific researchers of various levels. 77 Professors, holding Doctor of Science (Dr. Sci.) degree, and 248 researchers having PhD degree are actively working at INEOS RAS.

INEOS RAS is an internationally recognized research establishment, where the chemistry of organoelement and macromolecular compounds is developed. Its reputation as a scientific centre in chemistry is very high both in Russia and abroad. Many outstanding scientists who initiated new directions in organic and organoelement chemistry, polymer chemistry, physical chemistry, and physics, such as K.A. Andrianov, I.L. Knunyants, V.V. Korshak, I.V. Obreimov, M.E. Vol’pin, M.I. Kabachnik, O.A. Reutov, D.N. Kursanov, Yu.T. Struchkov, R.Kh. Freydlina, A.I. Kitaigorodsky, T.A. Mastryukova, M.Yu. Antipin and many others have been fruitfully working at INEOS RAS.

For recent years the scientific activities of the Institute have been supported by ~20 international grants (7th European Commission program, Swiss National Science Foundation (SNCF), Deutsche Forschungsgemeinschaft (DFG), etc.), 50-60 grants from the Russian Foundation for Basic Research (RFBR), more than 50 grants from the Presidium of the RAS and Department of Chemistry and Material Sciences of the RAS. INEOS is also incorporated in six Federal Scientific and Technical Programmes. Six young scientists received personal Grants from the President of Russian Federation for Government support of Young Russian Scientists and four scientists received the grants from Foundation for Russian Science Support.

One of the important part of the INEOS RAS activity aimed at the future is the training of young specialists of high qualification. In 2003, a scientific educational centre “INEOS Department” was founded within the framework of the RAS Presidium Programme “Support for Young Scientists” and according to the resolution of the INEOS RAS Scientific Council. The goal of the Centre is to train a new generation of young highly educated specialists of wide profile who know modern research methods, on the basis of the priority scientific line performed at INEOS RAS.

The results of scientific research carried out at the Institute since 2008 have been summarized in more than 1500 scientific papers and 16 monographs. For the past five years, mutually beneficial contracts have been signed with numerous universities, institutes and industrial centres in Russia and abroad. Outstanding foreign scientists and representatives of science-oriented companies are frequent visitors to INEOS RAS. The Institute participates in several joint projects with foreign institutions and companies directed to research collaboration and commercialization of “know-how” and new synthesized products.

Within the recent years INEOS RAS participated in organization of more than 20 conferences, symposia, and seminars. The list of most important international meetings includes the following international conferences:

Condensation Polymers: Synthesis, Structure, Properties - to 90th Anniversary of V.V. Korshak (1999)
Horizons of Organic and Organometallic Chemistry - to 100th Anniversary of A.N. Nesmeyanov (1999)
Kargin's Symposium “Chemistry and Physics of Polymers at the Beginning of the 21st Century” (2000)
Organometallic Compounds – the Materials of the Third Millenium (2000)
The 11th International Conference on Boron Chemistry (2002)
Modern Trends in Organometallic and Catalytic Chemistry – Mark Vol’pin Memorial International Symposium (2003)
Main Trends of Organophosphorus Compounds dedicated to the anniversary of academician M.I. Kabachnic (2003)
International Conference “Modern Trends in Organoelement and Polymer Chemistry” dedicated to 50th anniversary of INEOS RAS (2004)
10th All-Russian Conference Organosilicon compounds: Synthesis, Properties, and Application (dedicated to centenary of K.A. Andrianov) (2005)
7th All-Russian Conference “Fluorine Chemistry” (F-2006) devoted to the 100th anniversary of I.L. Knunyants (2006)
XVII Korshak's Lectures (2012)
Russian Conference "Actual problems of physics of polymers and biopolymers" (2012)
9th All-Russian Conference "Fluorine Chemistry" (2012)
International symposium “Modern trends in organometallic chemistry and catalysis” dedicated to the 90th anniversary of academician Mark Volpin (2013)
9th International Workshop on Silicon-Based polymers (2013)
The Chemistry of Organoelement Compounds and Polymers (2014)
Chemistry of Organoelement Compounds and Polymers (2019).

INEOS RAS includes 34 laboratories and 11 research teams:

Division of Organoelement compounds
101 Laboratory for Orgamometallic Compounds (LOMC)
102 Laboratory of Transition Metal p-Complexes (LTMPC)
103 Laboratory of Stereochemistry of Orgamometallic Compounds (LSOC)
104 Laboratory of Organoaluminium and Boron Compounds (LOABC)
105 Team of Activation of Inert Molecules (TAIM)
106 Laboratory of Metal Complex Activation of Small Molecules (LMCASM)
107 Laboratory of photosensible supramolecular systems (LPSMS)
109 Laboratory for Fine Organic Synthesis (LFOS)
110 Laboratory of mechanisms of chemical reactions (LMCR)
112 Laboratory of Organophosphorus Compounds (LOPC)
114 Laboratory of Organofluorine Compounds (LOFC)
115 Laboratory of Physiologically Active Organofluorine Compounds (LPAOC)
116 Laboratory of Asymmetric Catalysis (LAC)
117 Laboratory of Effective Catalysis (LEC)
118 Laboratory of Microanalysis (LMA)
119 Laboratory of Metal hydrides (LMH)
126 Laboratory of Ecological Chemistry (LEC)
127 Laboratory of aliphatic organoboron compounds (LAOBC)
128 Laboratory of Homolytic Reactions of Organoelement Compounds (LHROC)
130 Laboratory of Biologically Active Heterocycles Synthesis (LBAHS)
131 Laboratory of Metallacarboranes of Transition Metals (LMTM)
132 Team of Special Organic Analysts (TSOA)

Division of Macromolecular compounds
301 Team for Macromolecular Chemistry (TMC)
302 Laboratory for Heterochain Polymers (LHP)
303 Team for Functional Polymeric Systems (TFPS)
304 Laboratory for Organosilicon Compounds (LOSC)
306 Team for Filled Polymer Systems (TEFS)
308 Team of Synthesis of Heterocyclic Polymers (TSHP)
309 Team for Polymer Synthesis (TPS)
310 Laboratory for Polymer Physics (LPP)
311 Laboratory for Physical Chemistry of Polymers (LPCP)
312 Laboratory for polymer structure research (LPSR)
313 Laboratory for Polymer Materials (LPM)
314 Laboratory for Stereochemistry of Sorption Processes (LSSP)
315 Team of the mesomorphic organosilicon compounds (TMOC)
316 Laboratory of High-Molecular Compounds (LHMC)
318 Laboratory of polyarylenes (LPA)
322 Laboratory for Cryochemistry of (Bio)Polymers (LCB)
323 Laboratory for Physiologically Active Biopolymers (LPAB)

Laboratories of Physical Research Methods and Computing Chemistry
201 Laboratory for X-Ray Diffraction Studies (LXRDS)
202 Laboratory for Nuclear Magnetic Resonance (LNMR)
203 Laboratory for Physical Chemistry of Solid State (LPCSS)
204 Laboratory for Molecular Spectroscopy (LMS)
206 Team for Quantum Chemistry (TQC)
207 Team for Electronic Spin Resonance (TESP)

Awards and prizes in last years

2003 year
I.Ja. Eruhimovich – Humboldt Research Award (The Humboldt Prize).
S.N. Salazkin – Honorary title "Honoured Science Worker of the Russian Federation".

2004 year
Silver medal on Moscow International show of Industrial Ownership "Arhimed-2004" for active usage of trade mark.
Honorary diploma for active participation in organization and holding of 7th International show of Industrial Ownership "Arhimed-2004", Moscow.

2005 year
Yu.N. Bubnov – The order of honour for services in science and education area and many years fruitful work.
A.R. Khokhlov – The medal of order "For services towards motherland" in honour of 300th anniversary of MSU; Prize of Netherlands foundation of polymer technologies for outstanding science achievements.
V.A. Davankov – Golden medal of Martin, 2005 year, International chromatographic society; Honorary title "Honoured Science Worker of the Russian Federation".
A.A. Korlukov, K.A. Lysenko, O.A. Filippov, A.S. Shaplov – winners of Russian Federation President grants.

2006 year
Yu.N. Bubnov – A.N. Nesmeyanov Award (Russian: Премия имени А. Н. Несмеянова).
V.A. Vasnev – Honorary title "Honoured Science Worker of the Russian Federation".
A.A. Korlukov, K.A. Lysenko, O.A. Filippov, A.S. Shaplov, E.I. Gutsul, S.V. Timofeev – winners of Russian Federation President grants.

2007 year
V.I. Sokolov – Honorary title "Honoured Science Worker of the Russian Federation".
A.N. Bilyachenko, A.A. Korlukov, A.S. Shaplov, E.I. Gutsul, S.V. Timofeev – winners of Russian Federation President grants.

2008 year
A.R. Khokhlov – State Prize of the Russian Federation.
A.R. Krasnov – The order of Friendship for outstanding services in the matter of invention and adoption of new technologies; The medal of VOIR «For the great contribution in invention progress».
A.S. Shaplov – Academia Europaea's Award (The Academy of Europe) for young Russian scientists in chemistry field, prize-winner of the 14th competition (http://www.ae-info.org).
A.A. Askadsky – Honorary title "Honoured Science Worker of the Russian Federation".
K.A. Lysenko, Vologzhanina, D.A. Katayev, Lebed’, Makarov, D.S. Sapozhnikov, O.A. Filippov, A.S. Shaplov – winners of Russian Federation President grants (for 2008-2009 yrs.).
Y.S. Vygodskii, A.S. Shaplov, E.I. Lozinskaya - Gold medal from the XI International saloon of industrial properties “Archimed-2008” in the nomination of “Invention, industrial samples, trade marks” for the scientific work “Ionic Liquids in polymer synthesis”.

2009 year
A.S. Shaplov – winner of Russian Federation President grant (for 2009-2010 yrs.).

2010 year
Silver medal on Moscow International show of Industrial Ownership "Arhimed-2010" for active usage of trade mark.
A.L. Rusanov – Honorary title "Honoured Science Worker of the Russian Federation".
K.A. Lysenko – winner of Russian Federation President grant (for 2010-2011 yrs.).

2013 year
Y.S. Vygodskii, A.S. Shaplov, E.I. Lozinskaya - S.V. Lebedev Award presented by Russian Academy of Sciences for outstanding work in the field of chemistry and technology of synthetic rubber and other synthetic polymers.

2016 year

 E.S. Shubina  –  officer of the Order of Academic Palms.

2019 year

 A.A. Trifonov  – officer of the Order of Academic Palms.

Special issues dedicated to chemists of INEOS RAS

In 2019 and 2020 scientific journal "Journal of Organometallic Chemistry" decided to publish two special issues on the occasion of the 120th anniversary of the famous Russian organometallic chemist Alexander N. Nesmeyanov and the occasion of the 70th birthday of professor Elena Shubina, to note the scientific contribution of scientists in organometallics and the field of non-covalent interactions (Shubina).

Historical background

At the INEOS's earliest stages it was implied that synthetic work in organoelement and macromolecular chemistry should be combined with the necessity of relevant theoretical and physical investigations, and therefore many laboratories at INEOS are carrying out their research at the junction of several branches in chemistry and physics. This determines “the points of growth” which lead to progress in modern science and technology as A.N. Nesmeyanov used to say. Apart from traditional, scientific disciplines (to which the organoelement chemistry itself belongs too), valuable experience accumulated during these years has given rise to a series of new scientific fields which are characterized by a unique combination of organic, organoelement, coordination, physical chemistry, and chemistry of the macromolecular and natural biologically active compounds.

Thus, new branches in chemistry have appeared at the junction of organic, organometallic and coordination chemistry, namely the chemistry of the organic derivatives of the transition metals, p-complexes and clusters, asymmetric catalysis etc. The unique properties of these new compounds made it possible to develop new organometallic catalysts, to study an activation of small molecules, including molecular nitrogen, hydrocarbons, etc. Combination of organic and organoelement chemistry with the experimental and theoretical methods of physical chemistry promoted the development of relevant studies in reactivity, structural chemistry, catalysis and molecular dynamics of organoelement compounds.

The interaction between organophosphorus chemistry, biochemistry, pharmacology, and toxicology made it possible to unlock the secrets of the mechanisms responsible for the action of organophosphorus compounds upon biological structures and living organisms. Significant progress has been also achieved in the field of new tumor-selective anticancer preparations and physiologically active organofluorine compounds.

The works at the junction of the organic and inorganic chemistry, studies of the processes of polymer formation as well as structure—property relations, brought about the chemistry of polymers with organoelement and inorganic molecular chains and opened the routes to novel classes of linear and network polymers. New materials with valuable thermal, catalytic, absorptional and electro-physical properties, engineering plastics, thermostable composites and adhesives, membranes and polymers for electronics and medicine have been made up on the basis of these polymers.

External links

Research institutes in the Soviet Union
Institutes of the Russian Academy of Sciences
Chemical research institutes
1954 establishments in the Soviet Union
Research institutes established in 1954